Kurt Bieber (January 5, 1929 – December 31, 2015) born Kermit Henry Bieber in Allentown, Pennsylvania was an American actor and male model who was photographed by Cris Alexander as the character Letch Feeley in Patrick Dennis' illustrated autobiographical novel Little Me. which became a Broadway musical hit in 1962.

Bieber appeared on Broadway in the original casts of Wish You Were Here (musical) in 1952; The Teahouse of the August Moon (play) and Wonderful Town both in 1953; and The World of Suzie Wong in 1968. He had small cameos on Cruising as a club goer and in Midnight Cowboy as a street hustler.

References 

American male actors
1930 births
2015 deaths